Carillons, musical instruments of bells in the percussion family, are found throughout the United States. Several institutions register and count them. Some registries specialize in counting specific types of carillons. For example, the War Memorial and Peace Carillons registry counts instruments which serve as war memorials or were built in the name of promoting world peace. TowerBells counts carillons played via a baton keyboard as "traditional carillons" and those with computerized or electronic mechanisms as "non-traditional carillons", among other bell instruments. It also publishes maps, technical specifications, and summary statistics. As the World Carillon Federation does not consider non-traditional carillons to be carillons, it counts only those which are played via a baton keyboard and without computerized or electronic mechanisms. According to TowerBells and the World Carillon Federation, there are about 170 existing traditional carillons in the United States.

The carillons in the United States, in Belgium, and in the Netherlands account for two-thirds of the world's total.

Alabama
 Birmingham: Rushton Memorial Carillon at Samford University in the Harwell Goodwin Davis Library.  60 bells.  Each inscribed with Biblical scripture or meaningful literary inscription.
 Huntsville: First Baptist Church, 1990. 48 bells by The Verdin Company. Carillon housed in the world's tallest prefabricated steeple: 229 ft (70 m). Traditional keyboard + 2 non-traditional electronic consoles.

Arizona
 Tempe: The ASU Symphonic Carillon  at Arizona State University. 258 bells, the largest Maas-Rowe collection.

California

 Berkeley: The Berkeley Carillon in Sather Tower at University of California, Berkeley, 1917. 61 bells, originally 12 bells (a chime), with an additional 49 bells installed in 1978 and 1983.
 Garden Grove: The Crystal Cathedral, 50 major-third bells. Royal Eijsbouts, Netherlands.
 Los Angeles: Von Kleinsmid Center Carillon at the University of Southern California, 167 foot tall tower.
 Riverside:
 The Mission Inn Hotel & Spa, 1944, designed by G. Stanley Wilson.
 University of California, Riverside, The carillon and tower were a gift from former University of California regent Philip L. Boyd and his wife Dorothy. The dedication of the carillon and tower took place on October 2, 1966.
 San Diego:
 Hardy Memorial Tower at San Diego State University, built in 1931. Contains the Fletcher Symphonic Carillon (also known as the Fletcher Chimes) (installed 1946), consisting of 204 bells over 6 octaves.
 Installed in 1946, a carillon was added to Balboa Park's California Building.
 Santa Barbara: Storke Tower (University of California, Santa Barbara)61 bells, heaviest , Petit & Fritsen 1969
 Stanford: Hoover Tower at Stanford University, California. 48 bells, originally 35 bells, with 13 more added in 2002, although only 13 of the original bells remain.

Colorado
 Denver:
 The Charles S. Hill Memorial Carillon at Johnson & Wales University, 1962. 30 bells. This is also the oldest Carillon in the State of Colorado.
 The Carl M. Williams Carillon at the University of Denver Ritchie Center, 1999. 65 bells. Made by Royal Eijsbouts, Netherlands
 Westminster: The Bell Tower at Westminster City Hall, 1988. 24 bells, originally 14 bells (a chime), with an additional 10 bells added in 1997.

Connecticut
 Danbury: The Bulkley Memorial Carillon, 1928. 25 bells, Meneely Bell Foundry, 15 bells 1928, 8 added 1928, 2 added 1936, at Saint James' Episcopal Church. Oldest carillon in Connecticut, and the first carillon made in America.
 Hartford: The Plumb Memorial Carillon at the chapel of Trinity College, 1932. 49 bells, expanded from 30 bells in 1974.
 Middletown: in the South College Building at Wesleyan University, 24 bells, mostly from the Netherlands, with the only rosewood console in the world, played by Wesleyan's Bell and Scroll Society.
 New Britain: The Philip B. Stanley Carillon in Robert S. Buol Tower at First Church of Christ, Congregational
 New Canaan: The Dana-Barton Carillon at Saint Mark's Episcopal Church
 New Haven: The Yale Memorial Carillon in Harkness Tower at Yale University, 1922. 54 bells, by Taylor (originally a chime of 10 bells; additional 44 bells installed 1966).
 New Milford: Jose M. Ferrer Memorial Carillon in the Chapel of Our Lady at Canterbury School. Built in 1931 with 23 Gillett & Johnston bells.
 Simsbury: The Foreman Memorial Carillon in Simsbury United Methodist Church, 1986. 55 bells, by Petit & Fritsen.
 Stamford: The Walter N. Maguire Memorial Carillon in Maguire Memorial Tower at First Presbyterian Church
 Storrs: The Austin Cornelius Dunham Memorial Carillon at Storrs Congregational Church
 Wallingford; Seymour St. John Chapel, at Choate Rosemary Hall 10 bell Carillon. Erected 1923, restored in 2005.
 West Hartford: The Gordon Stearns Memorial Carillon at First Church of Christ, Congregational.

Delaware
 Wilmington: The carillon on the grounds of the Nemours Mansion and Gardens comprises 31 bells at 25 tons in a 210-foot tower by the architects Massena and DuPont.

District of Columbia

 Robert A. Taft Memorial and Carillon near the Capitol building, 27 bells by Paccard.
 Campanile of the Knights of Columbus Tower at the Basilica of the National Shrine of the Immaculate Conception, completed 1963. 56 bells by Paccard, gift of the Knights of Columbus to the American Roman Catholic bishops.
 Pelzman Memorial Glockenspiel at the National Zoo, tower includes four moving figures of zoo animals. Traditional carillon of 35 bells by Petit & Fritsen, 1976. Has been relocated on the park grounds, and is presently inoperable.
 Kibbey Carillon at the National Cathedral installed in 1963, is the 3rd heaviest in the world. 53 bells by Taylor.

Florida

 Clearwater: The Betty Jane Dimmit Memorial Carillon in the Episcopal Church of the Ascension, 1982. 49 bells by Eijsbouts.
 Gainesville: Century Tower (University of Florida)61 bells, heaviest , Royal Eijsbouts 1979 and 2003
 Lake Wales: Bok Tower Gardens at Historic Bok Sanctuary, completed 1928. 60 bells, by Taylor, ranging from 16 pounds to 11.5 tons; total bell metal weight 62 tons. Built as the centerpiece to the gardens, which were designed by Frederick Law Olmsted Jr. and funded by editor and philanthropist Edward W. Bok.
 White Springs: The Stephen Foster Memorial Carillon at Stephen Foster Folk Culture Center State Park includes 97 tubular bells from J.C. Deagan Company in 1958. It features the songs of Stephen Foster.

Georgia
 Stone Mountain: The Stone Mountain Carillon, in Stone Mountain Park. 732 bells. Originally built for the 1964 New York World's Fair.

Illinois

 Centralia: The Centralia Carillon, 1983. 65 bells, ~61,300 lb [27.8 t] (20 / 11,000 lb [9 / 5,000 kg]) by Fonderie Paccard. Currently 8th largest in the world.
 Champaign-Urbana: McFarland Carillon (University of Illinois Urbana-Champaign) - 48 bells.
 Chicago: Rockefeller Chapel (University of Chicago)72 bells, heaviest , Gillett & Johnston 1932
 Glencoe: Theodore C. Butz Memorial Carillon on Evening Island, Chicago Botanic Garden, 1986.  48 bells made in the Netherlands.
 Naperville: Moser Tower and Millennium Carillon72 bells, heaviest , Royal Eijsbouts 2000
 Plainfield: The Plainfield United Methodist Church had a partial carillon until the full 23 bells were finished in 2014.
 Springfield: Thomas Rees Memorial Carillon67 bells, heaviest  Petit & Fritsen 1962 and 2000

Indiana
 Bloomington: The Arthur R. Metz Memorial Carillon of Indiana University. Built in 1970 with 61 bells, tower rebuilt and 4 bells added in 2019. Rededicated as the Metz Bicentennial Grand Carillon in 2020, 65 bells.
 Culver: Memorial Chapel at Culver Military Academy, 51 bells. The Culver Military Academy was the final Gillett & Johnston carillon installation in North America, done in 1951.
 Indianapolis:
 Arsenal Technical High School.  Bell tower of Stuart Hall.
 The James Irving Holcomb Memorial Carillon Tower on the campus of Butler University.
 Muncie: Shafer Tower on the campus of Ball State University, 2002. 48 bells.
 Notre Dame: Basilica of the Sacred Heart at University of Notre Dame. 23 bells. Oldest Carillon in North America, built in 1865.

Iowa
 Ames: Stanton Memorial Carillon in the Campanile at Iowa State University, 1899. 50 bells by Taylor, originally built with 10 bells in 1899, with 26 more added in 1920, another 13 in 1954, and one final bell in 1967. Renovated in 1994.
 Cedar Falls: University of Northern Iowa Carillon in the Campanile at University of Northern Iowa, 1926. 47 bells by Meneely Bell Foundry, originally built with 15 bells in 1926, with 32 more added in 1968. Renovated in 1984 and 2007.
 Des Moines: The Cathedral Church of St. Paul, Episcopal Cathedral Church of St. Paul | Des Moines, Windsor Memorial Carillon. 25 bells in the Mary Belle Windsor Tower in downtown Des Moines. The 12 original bells were cast in 1896 by the McShane Foundry, Baltimore. Three additional bells were installed in 1989 and 10 more in 1991. These last 13 bells and the rebuild of the bell tower were a gift from the Windsor family, hence, the Windsor Memorial Carillon.

Kansas
 Lawrence: World War II Memorial Carillon at the University of Kansas53 bells, heaviest , John Taylor & Co 1949–51

Kentucky
 Berea:  Berea College's Phelps-Stokes Chapel Carillon, 1970s 56 bells. It is the largest in the state of Kentucky.

Louisiana
 Morgan City: Carillon Tower at Brownell Memorial Park, dedicated 1971.  106 feet tall with 61 bells.

Maryland
 Frederick: The Joseph Dill Baker Memorial Carillon in Baker Park. 49 bells, by Meneely Bell Foundry, Eijsbouts and Petit & Fritsen.

Massachusetts
 Amherst: The Henry Vincent Couper Memorial Carillon at the University of Massachusetts Amherst. It has 42 bells and spans 3 octaves. Bells cast by the Royal Eijsbouts Bell Foundry of Asten in the Netherlands.
 Cohasset: Erected in 1924 with 23 bells, known as The Bancroft Memorial Carillon. Located in a gothic stone tower in St. Stephen's Episcopal Church. Expanded in 1925, 1928 and then renovated and enlarged to 57 bells between 1989 and 1990 by the John Taylor Bell Foundry. Lowest bell, note G, weighs 11,280 pounds while the smallest bell, note E, weighs 29 pounds.
 Fall River: The Durfee Carillon Bell Tower at BMC Durfee High School, 23 bells, including 9 historic Meneely bells from the first Durfee High School 1880's
 Gloucester: Our Lady of Good Voyage Church.
 Medford: Goddard Chapel Carillon, Tufts University Chaplaincy.
 Northampton: Dorothea Carlile Memorial Carillon, College Hall at Smith College, 47 bells ranging in weight from 24 to 2,800 pounds.
 Northfield: McRoberts Memorial Carillon, Russell Sage Chapel at Northfield Campus, Northfield Mount Hermon School This 55-bell carillon has now been relocated to the Rhodes Arts Center on the Mount Hermon campus in Mount Hermon, MA.
 Norwood: Norwood Memorial Municipal Building50 bells, heaviest , Gillett & Johnston 1928/1935 and John Taylor & Co 1983
 Wellesley: Wellesley College Carillon at Wellesley College installed in 1931, renovated in 1984, last enlarged in 1990. 32 bells by Taylor.

Michigan
 Allendale: Cook Carillon Tower (Grand Valley State University), 48 bells, heaviest , Royal Eijsbouts 1994
 Ann Arbor:
 Burton Memorial Tower (University of Michigan)55 bells, heaviest , John Taylor & Co 1936 and 2011
 Lurie Tower (University of Michigan)60 bells, heaviest , Royal Eijsbouts 1996
 Big Rapids: Carillon Tower at Ferris State University, 1968.
 Bloomfield Hills:
 Kirk in the Hills. 77 bells. Second largest carillon in the world in terms of number of bells, tying the one in Daejeon, South Korea.
 Christ Church Cranbrook. 50 Bells w/ 6,700 lb B-Flat bourdon.
 Detroit:
 Jefferson Avenue Presbyterian Church, 1926. The 23 bells cast by the Gillett & Johnston foundry, have a total weight of 12,096 pounds and are played from a keyboard perched on a wooden platform right below the bell platform. It is the oldest carillon in Michigan.
 Nancy Brown Peace Carillon49-bells, 1940 and 2005
 The St. Mary of Redford Carillon, 2002. 51 bells cast by Paccard of Annecy, France News: St. Mary's of Redford has a new carillon for a keyboard range of c to d# with the lowest semitone omitted.  Additionally, three of the bells (d1, f#1, and a1) are also swinging bells.
 East Lansing: The Beaumont Tower Carillon at Michigan State University, 1928. 49 bells, originally ten bells, thirteen added in 1935, more added in 19__. Renovated by Eijsbouts in 1996.
 Grand Rapids: The Beckering Family Carillon on the Pew Campus of Grand Valley State University.
 Grosse Pointe: Grosse Pointe Memorial Church.  8 bells originally installed in 1927, with 39 bells added in 1952, and 1 more in 2015.
 Houghton: The J. R. Van Pelt Library of Michigan Technological University houses a carillon on the roof, and carillon console in the library.
 Kalamazoo: Former Episcopal Cathedral of Christ the King, 47 bells by Eijbouts.
 Lansing: Christopher Hansen Memorial Carillon, bell tower of the Central Methodist Church. 36 bells.
 Rochester: The Elliott Tower at Oakland University. 49 bells designed and installed by The Verdin Company, cast by Petit & Fritsen.

Minnesota
 Benson: Swift County Courthouse Clock Tower Carillon. 61 bells.
 New Ulm: Downtown New Ulm Schonlau Park. Freestanding tower with 37 bells designed by Schulmerich Carillon. One of three municipally owned carillon in the United States.
 Rochester: Plummer Building (Mayo Clinic)56 bells, heaviest , Gillett & Johnston 1927–28, Petit & Fritsen 1977, and John Taylor & Co 2006
 Saint Paul: House of Hope Presbyterian Church. Four-octave, fully chromatic instrument with 49 bells installed in 1923.

Missouri
 Clayton: Luther Tower on the Campus of Concordia Seminary. 49 bells.
 Springfield: Jane A. Meyer Carillon, Meyer Library at Missouri State University, dedicated in 2002. 48 bells by Eijsbouts.

Montana
 Missoula: The John C. Ellis Bell Tower at the University of Montana, 1953. 47 bells.

Nebraska
 Lincoln:  First-Plymouth Congregational Church.  57 bells.
 Omaha: The Henningson Memorial Campanile at the University of Nebraska at Omaha, constructed 1988.  47 bells by Paccard.

Nevada
 Las Vegas: Smith Center carillon, 47 bell, 4 octave, 17 story tall tower.

New Hampshire
 Concord: St. Paul's School. Houghton Memorial Carillon. 23 bells, by Gillett & Johnston.

New Jersey
 Morristown: St. Peter's Episcopal Church, 49 bells, heaviest unlisted, John Taylor & Co 1924 and Fonderie Paccard 1952
 Plainfield: Grace Episcopal Church47 bells, heaviest unlisted, Gillett & Johnston 1923
 Princeton: Cleveland Tower (Princeton University)67 bells, heaviest , Gillett & Johnston 1927, Arthur Bigelow 1943, Fonderie Paccard 1966, and Petit & Fritsen 1993
 Rumson: St. George's-by-the-River Episcopal Church26 bells, heaviest unlisted, John Taylor & Co 1934

New York
Fredonia, NY University of New York College at Fredonia, carillon
 Albany: Albany City Hall49 bells , John Taylor & Co 1986 and 1989
 Alfred (village): The Davis Memorial Carillon. 47 bells. Erected in 1937.
 New York City: Riverside Church74 bells, heaviest , Gillett & Johnston 1925 and 1931, Van Bergen 1976, and Whitechapel 2003, moved from Park Avenue in 1929
 Rochester: The Hopeman Memorial Carillon in Rush Rhees Library at the University of Rochester, 1973. 50 bells by Eijstbouts.
 Williamsville: The Niederlander Carillon at Calvary Episcopal Church, 44 bells. Installed 1959.

North Carolina
Belmont: The William James Pharr Carillon in the First Presbyterian Church is a traditional carillon of 48 bells. The carillon was installed in 1984 and the bells were cast by the Royal Eijsbouts bell foundry. The smallest bell weighs 31 pounds, and the largest bell weighs 4,850 pounds. The carillon was a gift from Mrs. William James Pharr and is dedicated to the memory of her husband.
Boiling Springs: The Hollifield Bell Tower at Gardner-Webb University48 bells, 1997
 Durham: The Duke Chapel carillon at Duke University50 bells by Taylor, 1931–32.
 Raleigh: North Carolina State University Memorial Belltower55 bells, heaviest  B.A. Sunderlin Bellfoundry 2021
 Winston-Salem; Janet Jeffrey Carlile Harris Carillon in Wait Chapel at Wake Forest University, 1978 and 1981. The last carillon cast by Alfred Paccard.

Ohio

 Cleveland: The Alexander McGaffin Carillon. 47 bells by Eijsbouts, June, 1968.
 Cleveland Heights: St. Paul's Episcopal Church; Erected 1928 with 8 bells by Gillett and Johnston, 15 bells by Van Bergen added in 1952, making a carillon of 23 bells
 Dayton: Deeds Carillon, Carillon Historical Park, 1942. 57 bells by Petit & Fritsen. Refurbished in 1988 from an electronic to a traditional carillon.
 Gambier: Church of the Holy Spirit on the campus of Kenyon College.  9 bells originally installed in 1879, with a 10th bell added probably in the 1940s.
 Mariemont: In Dogwood Park just off of Route 50, in Cincinnati, Ohio.
 Oxford: The Pulley Bell Tower at Miami University, constructed 2001. 50 bells designed and installed by The Verdin Company, cast by Petit & Fritsen.

Oklahoma
 Oklahoma City:
 V.V. Harris Carillon at St. Luke's UMC. 42 bells by Petit & Fritsen.
  at Westminster Presbyterian Church.  42 bells by Petit & Fritsen.

Pennsylvania
 Bryn Mawr: Bryn Mawr Presbyterian Church tower, 49 bells. Installed May 2006.
 Erie: Floyd and Juanita Smith Carillon at Pennsylvania State University Erie, The Behrend College, 2002. 48 bells, by Meeks, Watson, and Co., ranging from 15.25 pounds to 1,344 pounds.
 Fort Washington: St. Thomas Church, Whitemarsh, Catherine Colt Dickey Memorial Carillon, 1974. 48 bells weighing approximately 18 tons. Bells cast by Dutch foundry, Petit and Fritsen.
 Gettysburg: Gettysburg College has a carillon adjacent to its Quarry Lake.
 Kennett Square: Longwood Gardens, Chimes Tower, 62 bells.  The original was by J.C. Deagan Company of Chicago, but the current 62-bell instrument is by Royal Eijsbouts bell foundry. Built by Pierre S. du Pont.
 Kingston: Wyoming Seminary College Preparatory School, founded 1844.  "The Bell Tower" was saved from part of Nelson hall, which was mostly destroyed in the Agnes Flood of 1972.
 Lock Haven: The Fredericks Family Carillon at Lock Haven University. 47 bells by van Bergen Bells, 2000
 Mercersburg: Mercersburg Academy50 bells, heaviest , Gillett & Johnson 1926, Meeks & Watson 1996, and Whitechapel 2008
 New Wilmington: Westminster College The Duff Arrington Memorial Carillon has 42 Bells. Residing in the college's Old Main Tower, it was originally a chime of 12 bells (Meneely). Was expanded in 1978 to 35 bells and again in 2006 to 42 bells (Petit and Fritsen).
 Philadelphia: The Miraculous Medal Shrine Carillon, 1901.  Built with 26 bells, after renovation in 1952, 47 bells.  By Paccard Foundry.
 Pittsburgh: Bell tower of the Allegheny County Courthouse.
 Sharon: St. John's Episcopal Church, 28 bells Eijstbouts foundry Netherlands. Gift of the Mellon family.
 Valley Forge: National Patriots Bell Tower at the Washington Memorial Chapel, 1953. 58 bells, ~57,300 lb [26 t] (13.5 / approx. 8,800 lb [6 / 4,000 kg]), lower 28 by Meneely Bell Foundry and upper 30 by Paccard.

South Carolina
 Charleston: The Carillon and Thomas Dry Howie Tower at The Citadel has 59 bells weighing from 25 to 4,400 pounds and a total of 25,000 pounds, and were originally cast in 1795 at the Bergen Bell foundry in the Netherlands. Installed in 1954, as of 2022 only 18 bells are playable.
 Clemson: The Clemson University Memorial Carillon. 48 handcrafted bells, located in the tower of Tillman Hall at Clemson University.
 Greenville: The Riverplace Bell Tower and Carillon. 25 bells were placed within 3 steel columns, the tallest at 54 feet. The open structure of the tower was designed to view the river and cityscape nearby, under the tower is a continuously flowing water feature. The tower was installed in 2012 and dedicated to C. Thomas Wyche "Tommy" on August 23, 2012. Wyche was chosen for his love of music and lifelong support of the city's arts, land preservation, and future development.
 Greenwood: The Callie Self Memorial Baptist Church Carillon.  37 bells in a 3-octave scale. Bells cast by the Van Bergen Bellfoundries, Heiligerlee, Netherlands. Restored in the 1990s over a one-year period by L. Eckert, a then employee of the foundry's US Office based in Charleston, SC.

South Dakota
 Brookings: South Dakota State University, Coughlin Campanile. 1926.

Tennessee

 Jackson: Jackson Memorial Carillon, First Presbyterian Church, 47 Paccard bells
 Memphis: The Idlewild Carillon in Idlewild Presbyterian Church. Completed in 1999 and has 48 bells.
 Nashville:
 Belmont Tower and Carillon (Belmont University)43 bells, heaviest , Gillet & Johnston 1928
 Allen Bell Tower (Lipscomb University)35 bells
 Ooltewah, Tennessee: The Linnie M. Barger Memorial Carillon, designed and cast by Meeks & Watson. 19-bell chime in 2002; tower raised 20 feet,  enlarged to 26 bells in 2005-6 and 27 bells in 2012. Unusual open steel framework tower.
 Sewanee: Leonidas Polk Memorial Carillon, All Saints' Chapel, University of the South. 56 bells installed in 1958 by Paccard.

Texas
 Austin: Kniker Carillon in the Main Building Tower at the University of Texas. 56 bells.
 Dallas:
 Porter Memorial Carillon at Highland Park United Methodist Church, 1984. 48 bells, 26 / 5,100 lb [~12 / 2,300 kg] by Paccard.
 New Bell Tower Carillon, Cathedral Santuario de Guadalupe, 2005, 49 bells.
 St. Mark's School of Texas, donated by the Roosevelt family.
 Houston: The Bell Tower Center Carillon, 1986.  53 bells, made by Eijsbouts.  Based on 47 bells from the Eijsbouts 48-bell traveling carillon that appeared at the 1986 World Carillon Congress in Ann Arbor, Michigan.  Upgraded to 53 bells in 1991 by Eijsbouts. Photographs
 Fort Worth: Robert Carr Chapel located on the campus of Texas Christian University is home to "Carillon Americana Bells." A gift from Mrs. and Mrs. Robert G Carr.
 Lubbock: The Baird Memorial Carillon, west bell tower of Administration Building at Texas Tech University, 1976. 43 bells, including bells from Whitechapel, Fonderie Paccard, and Meeks, Watson, and Co. Refurbished in 2004–2005 by Meeks and Watson.
 San Antonio: The Nordan Memorial Carillon at Central Christian Church, 1953. 48 bells (originally 47 and one in 1969), 19 / 3,850 lb [~9 / ~1,750 kg] by Petit & Fritsen.
 Tyler: Dub and B.J. Riter Millennium Carillon Tower, University of Texas at Tyler. 57 bells by Verdin. Completed in 2001.
 Waco: The McLane Carillon in Pat Neff Hall located at Baylor University, dedicated in 1988. 48 bells by Paccard in Annecy, France.

Utah
 Provo: Brigham Young University Centennial Carillon Tower52 bells, heaviest , Petit & Fritsen 1975

Vermont
 Middlebury: The Mead Chapel Carillon at Middlebury College, 1986. 48 bells, cast in France.
 Northfield: Adams Bell Tower at Norwich University, 47 bells (bourdon 1,200 lb [544 kg]).

Virginia
 Arlington: Netherlands Carillon53 bells, heaviest , Van Bergen/Petit & Fritsen/Royal Eijsbouts 1954, Royal Eijsbouts 1995 and 2020
 Charlottesville: Christ Episcopal Church, traditional carillon of 23 bells, installed in 1947 with bells made by Gillett & Johnston.
 Luray: The Luray Singing Tower. 47 bells by Taylor, 1937
 Richmond: World War I Memorial Carillon tower, 1932. Built with 66 bells (53 notes). After a 1970s renovation, 53 bells.
 Roanoke:  Jessie Ball duPont Chapel, Hollins University, 1959.  47 bells, by Fonderie Paccard.

Washington
 Vancouver: Salmon Run Bell Tower at Esther Short Park, 2002. 35 bells cast by Royal Eijsbouts, Netherlands. Electric action with glockenspiel display.
 Spokane: The Cathedral of St. John the Evangelist, 49 bells, cast and installed by John Taylor and Sons of Loughborough, Leicestershire, England.

West Virginia
 Athens:  The Marsh Memorial Carillon, 1997 at Concord University. 48 bells by Paccard, a gift from former Concord President Dr Joseph Marsh.

Wisconsin

 Green Bay: First Ev. Lutheran Church.  The gift of and supported by the Kaap Memorial Carillon Fund, and the carillon was dedicated in service on Sunday afternoon, December 22, 1957.
 Madison: Carillon Tower on campus of the University of Wisconsin–Madison, designed under direction of Arthur Peabody, (1934), 56 bells.
 Milwaukee: Marquette Hall at Marquette University
 Monona: Tower of Memories at Roselawn Memorial Park, built in 1936. Neogothic revival style. Deagan

See also
 Index of campanology articles

References

Bell towers in the United States
United States, List of carillons in the